= Al-Aqsa Islamic Academy =

Islamic school in Philadelphia, Pennsylvania, USA

Coordinates: 39.9739°N 75.1413°W

Al-Aqsa Islamic Academy is an Islamic private day and weekend school in Philadelphia, Pennsylvania, established in 1996. It has a coeducational kindergarten through 12th grade. It is affiliated with the Al-Aqsa Islamic Society and is located in a common building, 1501 Germantown Avenue, Philadelphia, PA 19122. Coursework includes Islamic studies, the Arabic language, and Quran classes.

In 2004, the Al-Aqsa Islamic Society building received murals and decorative tiling. In 2006, volunteers added more decorative work to the building.

There was a December 2015 vandalism incident involving someone placing a pig's head on the property. Pig heads are especially offensive to Muslims. The school has also been a part of interfaith efforts in Philadelphia, including a Muslim/Jewish interfaith basketball game — played on the Philadelphia 76ers home court at Wells Fargo Center— organized by an area teen as part of his Bar Mitzvah project.
